Tyrin Turner is an American film and television actor and writer from South Central Los Angeles. He is most known for playing the lead role of Caine Lawson in the critically acclaimed 1993 urban drama Menace II Society.

Career

Turner is best known for playing the main character, Kaydee "Caine" Lawson, in the 1993 film Menace II Society. He also has made guest appearances on television shows such as Chicago Hope and Hangin' with Mr. Cooper and made numerous cameo appearances in urban music videos throughout the 1990s. Turner played the central character in Janet Jackson's 1989 long-form music video for her single Rhythm Nation.

For over twenty years, Turner has been working behind the scenes writing comedy material for his close friend Jamie Foxx and for comedian Affion Crockett.

Personal life
Turner is married to Amina Garner. He is the father to fraternal twins, daughter Tai and son Tyrin Jr.

Turner joined Foxx and Stephen Jackson when they both spoke out in Minneapolis following the murder of George Floyd.

Filmography

Film

Television

Music Videos
scarface- Never seen a Man Cry 1995

Discography

Guest appearances
1989: "Rhythm Nation 1814"  (Janet Jackson) 
1995: "Lockdown"  (D.E.E.P.) 
1995: "Illusions"  (Cypress Hill) 
1996: "Can't Be Wasting My Time"  (Mona Lisa feat. Lost Boyz) 
1998: "Dawn 2 Dusk"  (Geto Boys feat. DMG, & Yukmouth) 
1998: "Money By The Ton"  (C-Bo feat. Mississippi) 
1998: "Menace Niggas Never Die"  (Scarface feat. Menace Clan & Caine) 
2013: "Tired Of Running"  (Snoop Dogg) 
2015: "Dumb Shit"  (Tyrese) feat. Snoop Dogg

References

External links
 

Living people
American male film actors
African-American male actors
African-American male rappers
Male actors from Los Angeles
20th-century American male actors
21st-century American male actors
21st-century American rappers
21st-century American male musicians
21st-century African-American musicians
20th-century African-American people
Year of birth missing (living people)